The Bernard Baruch Handicap is a Grade III American Thoroughbred horse race for three-years-old and older run over a distance of  miles on the turf annually in early August at Saratoga Race Course in Saratoga Springs, New York.  The event currently offers a purse of $200,000.

History

The event is named in honor of Bernard Baruch who was a statesman, an adviser to various Presidents of the United States, and a lover of horses, thoroughbred horse racing, and the life of America's racetracks.

The inaugural running of the event was on 12 August 1959 as the Bernard Baruch Stakes for three year old horses over a distance of  miles on the dirt and was won by Middle Brother, ridden by Bobby Ussery defeating Howard B. Keck's Bagdad by a neck in a time of 1:49 flat setting a new track record. The event was again held for three year old horses in 1960, but in 1961 the event was moved to the turf.

During the early runnings, the event would have many more nominations than would allow to start in one race forcing Saratoga's administration to either disallow acceptance or splitting the event into two divisions. This happened seven times with the event split into divisions in 1967, 1968, 1969, 1970, 1972, 1973, 1981 and 1983.

The event was classified as Grade III in 1973 with it being upgraded to Grade II  
in 1983. For two runnings the event was Grade I, in 1988 and 1989 before returning to Grade II in 1990.

In 1975, there was a dead heat for first place between Salt Marsh and War McAllister.
 
In 1979, the race was switched to dirt due to weather conditions.

In the 1960s the event attracted many high calibre horses. Of these who won the event were crowned US Champion Male Turf Horse. This includes the 1966 winner Assagai, 1967 Division 2 winner Fort Marcy and the South African bred champion Hawaii in 1969.

The event even in today's Breeders' Cup era continues to attract excellent horses who have run in this race. The 2005 winner Artie Schiller went on to win the Breeders' Cup Mile later in the year, while the 2013 US Horse of the Year, Wise Dan  won the 2014 event by a nose as an odds-on favorite.

In 2022 the event was downgraded by the Thoroughbred Owners and Breeders Association to Grade III status.

Records
Speed  record: 
 miles: 1:38.29 –  Ring Weekend  (2016)
 miles: 1:45.33 – Shakis (2007)

Margins:
 5 lengths – Steinlen (GB) (1989)

Most wins:
 2 – Red Reality (1971, 1973)
 2 – Win (1984, 1985)
 2 – Fourstars Allstar (1992, 1995)
 2 – Hap (2000, 2001)
 2 – Shakis (2007, 2008)
 2 - Qurbaan (2018, 2019)

Most wins by an owner:
 6 – Cragwood Stables (1966, 1969 (2), 1971, 1973 (2))

Most wins by a jockey:
 7 – Jerry Bailey (1983, 1993, 1998, 2000, 2001, 2002, 2004)

Most wins by a trainer:
 7 – MacKenzie Miller (1966, 1969 (2), 1971, 1973 (2), 1990)

Winners

Legend:

See also
List of American and Canadian Graded races

References

Graded stakes races in the United States
Grade 3 stakes races in the United States
Open mile category horse races
Horse races in New York (state)
Turf races in the United States
Saratoga Race Course
Recurring sporting events established in 1959
1959 establishments in New York (state)
Bernard Baruch